Mahuvar is a census town in Navsari district in the Indian state of Gujarat.

Demographics
 India census, Mahuvar had a population of 9715. Males constitute 52% of the population and females 48%. Mahuvar has an average literacy rate of 78%, higher than the national average of 59.5%: male literacy is 81%, and female literacy is 74%. In Mahuvar, 11% of the population is under 6 years of age.

References

Cities and towns in Navsari district